Short Cinema Journal (a.k.a. SHORT) was a DVD Magazine focused on independent short films, interviews and documentaries The first three issues were released via PolyGram Filmed Entertainment. After PolyGram's reorganization, the magazine was picked up by Warner Bros. Home Video (and is still available online, including: Circuit: A Music Journal and Young Cinematographer) who gave it the title SHORT and added short International release issues. The first three issues were re-released by Warner during 1999 and 2000. Beginning with issue 4, the magazine included commercial advertisements that could not be bypassed or fast forwarded through.

The investors (East West Capital and Allen & Company NYC) sold QuickBand Networks to On2 Technologies. The parent company of SHORT was renamed to 2014 after the address '2014 Pacific Ave. Venice, CA 90291'. 2014 was the first content start-up to get venture funding in Venice

Short Cinema Journal

Short International Release

Notes and references
 

DVD magazines
Magazines established in 1997